Asele Disep Woy (born 3 January 1959) is a Nigerian sprinter. She competed in the women's 4 × 400 metres relay at the 1980 Summer Olympics.

References

External links
 

1959 births
Living people
Athletes (track and field) at the 1980 Summer Olympics
Nigerian female sprinters
Olympic athletes of Nigeria
Olympic female sprinters
20th-century Nigerian women